Edina Maria Ronay FRSA (born 8 January 1943) is an Anglo-Hungarian fashion designer and former actress. She is the daughter of food critic Egon Ronay and the mother of actress/writer Shebah Ronay.

In films and television from 1960, Ronay's numerous TV roles included The Avengers, No Hiding Place, Special Branch, The Champions, Randall and Hopkirk (Deceased) and Jason King.

She retired from acting in the mid-1970s to take up fashion design, specialising in knitwear; she eventually formed her own company in 1984. Ronay was honoured as a Fellow of the Royal Society of Arts.

Filmography
The Pure Hell of St Trinian's (1960) - Lavinia (uncredited)
Edgar Wallace Mysteries Episode:  Five to One (film) (1963) - Gloria
A Hard Day's Night (1964) - Girl at Disco (uncredited)
Night Train to Paris (1964) - Julie
The Black Torment (1964) - Lucy Judd
The Collector (1965) - Nurse / Next Victim (uncredited)
A Study in Terror (1965) - Mary Jane Kelly
He Who Rides a Tiger (1965) - Anna
The Big Job (1965) - Sally Gamely
Carry On Cowboy (1965) - Dolores
Prehistoric Women (1967) - Saria
Our Mother's House (1967) - Doreen
The Window Cleaner (1968) - Sharon
To Grab the Ring (1968) - Vriendin
Three (1969) - Liz
Poussez pas grand-père dans les cactus (1969) - Nathalie, Hostess
The Swordsman (1974) - Guy Champion

References

External links
 Official website

1943 births
Living people
Actresses from Budapest
English fashion designers
English television actresses
Hungarian emigrants to England
English film actresses
Alumni of RADA
British women fashion designers